Peridroma selenias is a moth of the family Noctuidae. It was first described by Edward Meyrick in 1899. It is endemic to the Hawaiian islands of Kauai, Oahu and Hawaii.

External links

Noctuinae
Endemic moths of Hawaii
Moths described in 1899